The Heber Scowcroft House is a historic two-story house in Ogden, Utah. It was built in 1909 for Heber Scowcroft, an immigrant from England who moved to Utah with his family in 1880 after converting to the Church of Jesus Christ of Latter-day Saints. Scowcroft later worked as the vice president of John Scowcroft and Son, a wholesale dry goods company founded by his father and based in the Scowcroft Warehouse. The house was designed in the Colonial Revival style by architect Moroni Charles Woods. It has been listed on the National Register of Historic Places since December 13, 1991.

References

		
National Register of Historic Places in Weber County, Utah
Colonial Revival architecture in Utah
Houses completed in 1909
1909 establishments in Utah